Ricardo Manuel da Silva Fernandes (born 14 January 1978) is a Portuguese former professional footballer who played as a central defender.

Club career
Fernandes was born in Azurém, Guimarães. After making his Primeira Liga debut with lowly S.C. Salgueiros, which folded soon after, he moved to Moreirense FC, playing there for a further two top flight seasons. For 2005–06 he joined Madeira's C.D. Nacional, being an undisputed starter from the beginning and helping it achieve a fifth place (with the subsequent qualification to the UEFA Cup) in his first year.

Fernandes signed for Romania's FC Rapid București in July 2008, alongside compatriot José Peseiro whom arrived as manager. In the 2010–11 campaign he lost his starting position with the Liga I club and, in January 2011, aged 33, returned to his country and joined Rio Ave FC.

In June 2011, after no official appearances for the Vila do Conde team, Fernandes signed with former club Moreirense in the second division. He only missed four league games in his first season, as the Moreira de Cónegos side returned to the top level after seven years.

International career
Fernandes won one cap for Portugal B, playing the first half of a 0–1 defeat to Romania for the Vale do Tejo Tournament held in Santarém, on 25 January 2001.

References

External links

1978 births
Living people
Sportspeople from Guimarães
Portuguese footballers
Association football defenders
Primeira Liga players
Liga Portugal 2 players
Segunda Divisão players
AD Fafe players
S.C. Salgueiros players
Moreirense F.C. players
C.D. Nacional players
FC Rapid București players
Rio Ave F.C. players
Pevidém S.C. players
Liga I players
Portugal B international footballers
Portuguese expatriate footballers
Expatriate footballers in Romania
Portuguese expatriate sportspeople in Romania